Galiniera is a genus of flowering plants in the family Rubiaceae. The genus is found in tropical Africa and Madagascar.

Species
Galiniera myrtoides 
Galiniera saxifraga

References

Rubiaceae genera
Octotropideae